Peggy Kornegger is an American writer. In the 1970s she identified herself as an anarcha-feminist, and was an editor of the American feminist magazine The Second Wave. Her article "Anarchism: The Feminist Connection" (1975) was reprinted as a booklet in New York City and London in 1977, translated into Italian for a journal in Italy, and included in the book Reinventing Anarchy in 1979.  Her book Living with Spirit, Journey of a Flower Child was published in 2009.

Bibliography 
 Anarchism: The Feminist Connection (1975)
 Living with Spirit, Journey of a Flower Child (2009)
 Lose Your Mind, Open Your Heart (2014)

References

External links
Anarchism: The Feminist Connection
Anarchism The Feminist Connection

Year of birth missing (living people)
Living people
American feminists
Anarcha-feminists
20th-century American women writers
American editors
American women editors
21st-century American women